The 2015 Windsor and Maidenhead Borough Council election took place on 7 May 2015 to elect all members of the council of the Royal Borough of Windsor and Maidenhead in England. This was on the same day as other local elections and coincided with the 2015 United Kingdom general election.

Election result

The election saw an eight-seat enlargement of local Conservatives' running group, having been the designation of the absolute majority of winning candidates hence governing group since 2007; the results saw four Independent (politician)s one of whom had defected in the previous term overturned, the latter in the same way as two UKIP councillors — and two Liberal Democrats lost to Conservatives. All wards of the United Kingdom in this borough consequently were served by Conservative councillors save for Old Windsor choosing its two delegates to be from Old Windsor Residents and Taxpayers Association and three-member Pinkneys Green at the opposite end of the borough which elected one Liberal Democrat, topping the poll by seven votes ahead of two Conservatives it elected and 312 votes ahead of the runner-up.  Having run the council from 1995-1997 and 2003-2007, the party's single councillor represented a record low for the party, meaning the resident's association mentioned became the formal opposition. Not elected was Ewan Larcombe who in 2011 founded the National Flood Prevention Party in Horton and Wraysbury and took his position regarding the intense 2013-2014 and dynamic of the River Thames since construction of the Jubilee River, its corollary protecting most of the borough;

Wards

References

2015 English local elections
May 2015 events in the United Kingdom
2015
2010s in Berkshire